Chen Zihan (born 2 April 1978 as Chen Shasha) is a Chinese actress. She graduated from the Beijing Film Academy.

Birth date
While the majority of sources state Chen's birth date as 2 April 1978, some claim that she was born on 2 April 1975.

Filmography

Film

Television series

Awards and nominations

References

External links
 
 
  Chen Zihan on Sina.com

Living people
Actresses from Chongqing
Beijing Film Academy alumni
1978 births
Chinese film actresses
Chinese television actresses
21st-century Chinese actresses